Veuillot is a French surname. Notable people with this surname include:

 Louis Veuillot (1813–1883), French journalist and author
 Pierre Veuillot (1913–1968), French Roman Catholic Cardinal and Archbishop of Paris

French-language surnames
Surnames of French origin